The Grande ceinture Ouest line (French - Ligne Grande ceinture Ouest, or GCO) is a 10 km long section of the Grande Ceinture de Paris, located in Yvelines and reopened to the public on 12 December 2004, after being closed to passengers for 68 years. Managed by the SNCF, it links Saint-Germain-en-Laye (gare de Grande-Ceinture) to Noisy-le-Roi, via Saint-Nom-la-Bretèche.  The line is little used at the moment but nevertheless provides a window on the SNCF via the many innovative methods used on it.

See also
 Ligne de Grande Ceinture | Ligne de Petite Ceinture
 Transilien | Transilien Paris Saint-Lazare
 Z 6400
 Tangentielle Nord

References

External links
  Page of the STIF site dedicated to the extension of the Tangentielle ouest within the framework of the Contrat de Plan Etat Région 2000-2006.
  La Grande Ceinture Ouest and the Tangentielle Ouest project on the site of the municipal opposition of Poissy

Rail transport in Paris